Rebecca Buttigieg  (born 2 December 1993) is a Maltese politician from the Labour Party who is currently serving as Parliamentary Secretary for Reforms and Equality in the Maltese Government. She was elected to the Parliament of Malta in the 2022 general election. Buttigieg graduated from the University of Malta with a Bachelor of Arts degree in International Relations, and graduated from the University of Edinburgh with a Master of Science degree in Global Crime, Justice and Security.

References

See also 

 List of members of the parliament of Malta, 2022–2027

Living people
21st-century Maltese women politicians
21st-century Maltese politicians
Women government ministers of Malta
Labour Party (Malta) politicians
Members of the House of Representatives of Malta
1993 births